Emil Zeiß (2 July 1833 – 14 April 1910) was a German Protestant minister and painter. His body of work includes 33 sketchbooks and 1092 identified individual works, largely donated by his son to the Lippe Museum.

Life
Zeiß was born in the village of Stapelage in North Rhine-Westphalia. He attended the University of Marburg. On 30 November 1859 he was admitted as a candidate for ministry in the Reformed church after passing the first theological examination. Three years later, on 12 November 1862 he passed the second theological examination. He was called to be a pastor for the Church of Lippe in Barntrup and stayed there for two decades.

In 1904 he suffered a stroke and a year later he retired. He died in 1910 in Schwalenberg, where his son, Alexander Zeiß held a pastorate from 1885 to 1938.

Work
Zeiß worked mainly in watercolors and pencil, but there are some oil paintings. His main subjects are architecture, town views and landscapes from 1860-1880. Although he occasionally weiterschenkte images to friends and relatives, he was in his lifetime, not to persuade, to participate in exhibitions, although there were requests to. He was also friends with the painter Carl Gehrts (1853-1898). Today, Zeiß's many paintings of towns and villages in the Lippe area are important sources of local and regional history, showing the towns and villages before the advent of industrialization.

References

External links

 
Literature about Emil Zeiß  in the Catalog of the German National Library.

1833 births
1910 deaths
German Protestant clergy
19th-century German painters
19th-century German male artists
German male painters
20th-century German painters
20th-century German male artists
People from Lippe
University of Marburg alumni
Artists from North Rhine-Westphalia